Monster Fun was originally a weekly British comic strip magazine for children aged seven to twelve. Published by IPC Media, it ran for 73 issues in 1975–1976, when it merged with Buster. Focused on humorous monster strips and stories, the magazine was known for "The Bad Time Bedtime Books" minicomic inserts, created by Leo Baxendale.

The nominal editor was "Frankie Stein" (a play on Frankenstein), a character who had previously appeared in the magazines Wham!, Shiver and Shake, and Whoopee!. Recurring artists included Robert Nixon, Thomas Williams, and Trevor Metcalfe.

The magazine was known for handing out free toys in its issues. The first issue, for instance, came with a free plate wobbler (a novelty item consisting of an inflatable rubber bladder and a hand-operated pump; the bladder is placed under a plate, and inflating it makes the plate wobble). The second issue had a "Freaky Spider Ring", the third a "Super Shaking Skeleton".

The comic was relaunched in April 2022 as a bi-monthly publication.

Publication history

Original IPC Run
Monster Fun's debut issue was dated 14 June 1975. Monster Fun Specials were printed in 1975 and 1976.

The magazine merged with Buster to form Buster and Monster Fun after the 30 October 1976 issue. Due to its ongoing popularity, the Monster Fun logo was printed on Busters cover until the summer of 1979.

Despite its short run, Monster Fun Annuals were printed every year, cover-dated from 1977 until 1985, though all contained some reprint material. They were all distributed in the UK from the autumn of the previous cover-dated year. Buster and Monster Fun Specials were printed (with much reprint material) every year from 1977 until 1996, making them one of the most long-lived of IPC / Fleetway titles. Almost all of the other original strips were reprinted in other titles in the 1980s and 1990s.

After Monster Fun'''s 1976 merger into Buster, the strips  Gums, Kid Kong, X-Ray Specs, Mummy's Boy, Draculass, Teddy Scare, Terror TV, and Martha's Monster Make-up all made the merger.

In February 1982 these merged magazines merged again with Jackpot. Kid Kong was terminated on this occasion.

In June 1984 the magazine merged with School Fun. The comic strip Gums was terminated on this occasion.

In 1988 the magazine merged with Nipper. Mummy's Boy was terminated on this occasion. X-Ray Specs had the most longevity continuing until Busters end (4 January 2000) though as with the all but one of the last Buster strips as reprints.

Rebellion revival
In September 2021 it was announced that Rebellion, publishers of 2000 AD would be relaunching the comic in April 2022, "revived and reimagined for today's kids".

Unlike the original IPC run, the Rebellion revival will be published every two months, rather than weekly. Characters who will appear within the comics include Frankie Stein, Kid Kong, Draculass, Sweeny Toddler, Gums, Teddy Scare, and The Leopard from Lime Street. The first issue in October 2021 was not part of the main sequence, as the publication's main subscription started from April 2022.

Issues:
Monster Fun Halloween Special issue ("Halloween Spooktacular") was published in October 2021. Included in this issue were Frankie Stein; Kid Kong; Draculass; Teddy Scare!; Gums; Sweeny Toddler; Harry & Gary; Evil Eye; Tokoloshe; Birdman, Chicken & Sparrow; Martha's Monster Makeup; Hell's Angel; Gah! The Gobblin' Goblin; Wiz War; The Leopard from Lime Street; Hire a Horror; Jump Junior, Monster Helper; Creature Teacher; Scare Salon and Grimly Feendish.
 "Easter Special 2022", released in April 2022 (cover date 06 April - 31 May 2022). Included in this issue were Kid Kong, Steel Commando, Frankie Stein, Draculass, a stand-alone story The Story of Easter, Hire a Horror, Martha's Monster Make Up, The Leopard from Lime Street and Hell's Angel, as well as puzzles and reader-submitted art. A special, webstore-only edition, included an addition story (Sweeney Toddler).
 "School's Out Special 2022", released in June 2022 (cover date 01 June - 02 August 2022). Included in this issue were Kid Kong, Steel Commando (continuing the story from issue 1), Frankie Stein, Draculass, a stand-alone story The Sun, Martha's Monster Make Up, Hire a Horror, The Leopard from Lime Street (continuing the story from issue 1) and Hell's Angel, as well as puzzles and reader-submitted art.
 "Summer Special 2022", released in August 2022 (cover date 03 August - 04 October 2022). Included in this issue were Kid Kong, Steel Commando (continuing the story from issue 2), Frankie Stein, Draculass, a stand-alone story Home Invaders, Martha's Monster Make Up, Hire a Horror, The Leopard from Lime Street (continuing the story from issue 2) and Hell's Angel, as well as puzzles and reader-submitted art.
 "Halloween Spooktacular 2022", released in October 2022 (cover date 05 Oct - 06 Dec 2022). Included in this issue were Kid Kong, Steel Commando (continuing the story from issue 3), Frankie Stein, Martha's Monster Make Up, a stand-alone story The Stain, Hire a Horror, Draculass, The Leopard from Lime Street (continuing the story from issue 3), and Hell's Angel, as well as puzzles and reader-submitted art.
 "Christmas Special 2022", released in December 2022 (cover date 07 Dec 2022 - 31 Jan 2023). Included in this issue were Kid Kong, The Spider Who Loved Me! (a story submitted by a reader in a competition, and scripted and illustrated by some of "Monster Fun"'s regular contributors), Steel Commando (continuing the story from issue 4), Frankie Stein, Draculass, a stand-alone story Clear and Present Danger, Hell's Angel, Martha's Monster Make Up, Hire a Horror and The Leopard from Lime Street (continuing the story from issue 4), as well as puzzles and reader-submitted art.
 'Ghoulish Gaming Special', released in February 2023 (cover date 01 Feb - 04 Apr 2023). Included in this issue were Gums (the first new 'Gums' strip since 1984), Kid Kong, Hell's Angel, Space Invaded! (part 1) (a new story for this publication), Steel Commando (continuing the story from issue 5), Martha's Monster Make-Up, Witch Vs Warlock (a new comic strip), Draculass, The Leopard from Lime Street (continuing the story from issue 5) and Hire a Horror, as well as puzzles and reader-submitted art.

 List of strips 

 Original strips 
 Arts Gallery (drawn by Mike Lacey)
 Brainy and his Monster Maker Cinders Creature Teacher (drawn by Thomas Williams)
 Dough Nut & Rusty (drawn by Trevor Metcalfe)
 Draculass (1975–1976; continued in Buster until 1977) (drawn by Terry Bave)
 Grizzly Bearhug The Invisible Monster Kid Kong (1975–1976; continued in Buster until 1982) (drawn by Robert Nixon)
 Major Jump Horror Hunter March of the Mighty Ones Martha's Monster Make-up (1975-1977) (drawn by Ken Reid)
 Monster Hits Jokes 
 Mummy's Boy (1975-1976; continued in Buster until 1988), (drawn by Norman Mansbridge)
 Tom Thumbscrew X-Ray Specs (1975-1976; continued in Buster until 2000) (drawn by Mike Lacey)

 Later strips 
 Gums (1976; continued in Buster until 1984) (by Roy Davies and Robert Nixon)
 Frankie's Diary Freaky Farm (drawn by Jim Watson)
 The Little Monsters S.O.S. Save Our Stan as well as many pull-out posters
 Teddy Scare (1976; continued in Buster until 1977) (by Barrie Appleby)
 Terror TV (1976; continued in Buster'' until 1978) (drawn by Ian Knox)

References 

1975 comics debuts
1976 comics endings
Fleetway and IPC Comics titles
Children's magazines published in the United Kingdom
Comics magazines published in the United Kingdom
Magazines established in 1975
Magazines disestablished in 1976
Defunct British comics
British humour comics
Weekly magazines published in the United Kingdom